The 2021 Zagreb Open was a professional tennis tournament played on clay courts. It was part of the 2021 ATP Challenger Tour. It took place in Zagreb, Croatia between 10 and 16 May 2021.

Singles main-draw entrants

Seeds

 Rankings are as of 3 May 2021.

Other entrants
The following players received wildcards into the singles main draw:
  Borna Gojo
  Nino Serdarušić
  Antun Vidak

The following player received entry into the singles main draw as an alternate:
  Dmitry Popko

The following players received entry from the qualifying draw:
  Sebastián Báez
  Marcelo Tomás Barrios Vera
  Ernests Gulbis
  Ramkumar Ramanathan

Champions

Singles

 Sebastián Báez def.  Juan Pablo Varillas 3–6, 6–3, 6–1.

Doubles

 Evan King /  Hunter Reese def.  Andrey Golubev /  Aleksandr Nedovyesov 6–2, 7–6(7–4).

References

2021 ATP Challenger Tour
2021 in Croatian tennis
May 2021 sports events in Croatia
Zagreb Open